Clark Glacier may refer to:
 Clark Glacier (Alaska), Glacier Bay National Park and Preserve, Alaska, United States
 Clark Glacier (Antarctica)
 Clark Glacier (Oregon), in Cascade Range, Oregon, United States
 Clark Glacier (Washington), in Cascade Range, Washington, United States

See also 
 Clarke Glacier (disambiguation)